Qiangqu (r. 179–188 AD) was the Western Wise Prince, successor to Huzheng, and chanyu of the Southern Xiongnu from 179 to 188 AD. 

Qiangqu's reign coincided with a troublesome time for the Han Empire, and few records address Chinese relations with the Southern Xiongnu. In 187 AD Qiangqu sent Southern Xiongnu cavalry troops under command of the Eastern Tuqi Prince (Wise Prince, Ch. Tuqi 屠耆) to aid the governor of Yuzhou province against the former governor, Zhongshan province, Zhang Shun, who had rebelled in alliance with the Xianbei. This caused discontent among the elders, who were alarmed by the frequency with which Qiangqu sent their men off to battle for the Han dynasty. In 188 AD, the Xiuchuge clan rose in rebellion and killed Qiangqu. The title of chanyu went to his son Yufuluo. The Jie branch of the Xiongnu is named after Qiangqu. Later on they created the Later Zhao Jie state led by Shi Le.

Footnotes

References

Bichurin N.Ya., "Collection of information on peoples in Central Asia in ancient times", vol. 1, p. 146, Sankt Petersburg, 1851, reprint Moscow-Leningrad, 1950  (Qian Han Shu Ch. 94b)

Taskin B.S., "Materials on Sünnu history", Science, Moscow, 1968, p. 31 (In Russian)

Chanyus
2nd-century monarchs in Asia